The Scrophulariaceae are a family of flowering plants, commonly known as the figwort family.  The plants are annual and perennial herbs, as well as shrubs.  Flowers have bilateral (zygomorphic) or rarely radial  (actinomorphic) symmetry.  The Scrophulariaceae have a cosmopolitan distribution, with the majority found in temperate areas, including tropical mountains.  The family name is based on the name of the included genus Scrophularia L.

Taxonomy

In the past, it was treated as including about 275 genera and over 5,000 species, but its circumscription has been radically altered since numerous molecular phylogenies have shown the traditional broad circumscription to be grossly polyphyletic.  Many genera have recently been transferred to other families within the Lamiales, notably Plantaginaceae and Orobanchaceae, but also several new families.  Several families of the Lamiales have had their circumscriptions enlarged to accommodate genera transferred from the Scrophulariacae sensu lato.

Fischer (2004) considered the family to consist of three subfamilies – Antirrhinoideae, Gratioloideae, and Digitalidoideae. He further divided the Gratioloideae into five tribes – Gratioleae, Angeloniaeae, Stemodieae, Limoselleae, and Lindernieae. He then divided the Gratioleae, with its 16 genera (and about 182 species) into three subtribes – Caprarinae, Dopatrinae, and Gratiolinae. The Gratiolinae had 10 genera (about 121 species) distributed through temperate and tropical America – Bacopa and Mecardonia (formerly Herpestis), Amphianthus, Gratiola, Sophronanthe, Benjaminia, Scoparia, Boelkea, Maeviella, and Braunblequetia. Many of these were transferred to the family Plantaginaceae, in the tribe Gratioleae.

Uses
The family includes some medicinal plants, among them:
 Scrophularia, figworts
 Verbascum, mulleins

Genera
The family Scrophulariaceae in its APG IV (2016) circumscription includes 62 genera and about 1830 known species.

Excluded genera
The following genera, traditionally included in the Scrophulariaceae, have been transferred to other families as indicated:

References

Further reading

External links

 Kew list of Scrophulariaceae
 Family Scrophulariaceae Flowers in Israel
 verbascum.org

 
Lamiales families